Ulrich Robeiri (born 26 October 1982) is a French right-handed épée fencer, two-time team European champion, six-time team world champion, 2014 individual world champion, and 2008 team Olympic champion.

Career
Robeiri was born in Cayenne, French Guiana. He began fencing at age 8 at the Éclaireuses et Éclaireurs de France, an interreligious scouting association. He first practiced foil, the traditional learning weapon, before turning to épée. He first joined the centre for promising young athletes in Les Abymes, in Guadeloupe, then at the age of 15, the centre of Reims in metropolitan France. In 2001, he earned a bronze medal in the Junior European Championships in Keszthely. A year later, he was admitted into INSEP, a state institution for high-performance  athletes. That same year, he earned the gold medal both in the individual and team event of the Junior World Championships in Antalya.

During his first season as a senior, he won the Lisbon Grand Prix and the Paris World Cup, and earned a bronze medal in the World Championships in Havana. He finished the season No.4 in world rankings. After a dry spell in 2003–04, he won the Heidenheim Grand Prix and the Puerto Rico World Cup in 2005. The same year, he joined the French national épée team, which had won the Olympic gold at Athens. With Érik Boisse, Jérôme Jeannet and Fabrice Jeannet, Robeiri won the gold medal at the World Championships. The team would come to be known as “the Invincibles”, as they dominated men's épée from 2004 to 2010 with eight consecutive world titles.

In the 2013–14 season, Robeiri placed second in the Berne Grand Prix and made it to the quarter-finals in the European Championships in Strasbourg before being defeated by Hungary's András Rédli, who eventually won the competition. A month after, Robeiri made it to the semi-final where he defeated his old teammate Gauthier Grumier. In the final, he prevailed over Park Kyoung-doo of South Korea to win his first individual World title.

Robeiri graduated from the Polytech'Paris-UPMC engineering school. He works as an engineer within the information and communications systems division of RATP Group, the public transport operator for Paris, with a special contract which allows him to train and to attend major competitions.

Medal Record

Olympic Games

World Championship

European Championship

Grand Prix

World Cup

References

External links
 Profile at the European Fencing Confederation

1982 births
Living people
Sportspeople from Cayenne
French male épée fencers
Fencers at the 2008 Summer Olympics
Olympic fencers of France
Olympic gold medalists for France
French people of French Guianan descent
French Guianan fencers
Medalists at the 2008 Summer Olympics
European champions for France
Olympic medalists in fencing